Pseudoreligion or pseudotheology is a pejorative for a non-mainstream belief-system or philosophy which is functionally similar to a religious movement, typically having a founder, principal text, liturgy and faith-based beliefs. Belief systems such as Theosophy, corporate Kabbalism, Christian Science, Scientology, Wahhabism, Salafism and the Nation of Islam have all been referred to as pseudoreligions, as have various New Age religions, as well as political ideologies such as Nazism and Positive Christianity. Within the academic debate, political ideologies that resemble religion are sometimes referred to as political religions.

Examples of marginal movements with founding figures, liturgies and recently invented traditions that have been studied as legitimate social practices include various New Age movements, and millennaristic movements such as the Ghost Dance and South Pacific cargo cults.

Quasi-religions 
In 1963, German-American philosopher Paul Tillich introduced a distinction between pseudo-religions and quasi-religions. He described pseudo-religions as movements which intentionally deceive adherents through their similarities with mainstream religions, while quasi-religions are non-religious movements which have unintended similarities to religions.

See also
 Folk religion
 Pseudophilosophy
 Pseudoscience
 Why I Hate Religion, But Love Jesus (2012 video)

References

External links
 "Pseudo-Science and Pseudo-Theology: (A) Cult and Occult"; Bube, Dr. Richard A., Journal of the American Scientific Affiliation, Issue 29, March 1977.
 "Bad Religions and Good Religions"; Carmine, Professor James D, IntellectualConservative.com, 14 December 2005.

Criticism of religion
Pejorative terms
Deception
Religion